This is a list of amphibians and reptiles in the archipelago of Cuba. It includes 27 reptiles and 55 amphibians that are critically endangered. Many of these animals are threatened by loss of habitat and hunting.

This list includes both native and introduced (I) species.

Reptilia

Turtles
The island is home to one terrestrial turtle, while marine species often come and go on the beaches.
 Cuban slider, Trachemys decussata
 Antillean terrapin, Pseudemys rugosa
 Green sea turtle, Chelonia mydas
 Hawksbill sea turtle, Eretmochelys imbricata
 Loggerhead sea turtle, Caretta caretta
 Leatherback turtle, Dermochelys coriacea
 Olive ridley sea turtle, Lepidochelys olivacea

Crocodilians
The Cuban crocodile is found in the Zapata Swamp region and the Isla de la Juventud. The spectacled caiman is not native to the island and was introduced by pet traders.

Crocodiles
 Cuban crocodile, Crocodylus rhombifer
 American crocodile, Crocodylus acutus

Caiman
 Spectacled caiman, Caiman crocodilus (I)

Snakes

 Cuban boa, Chilabothrus angulifer
 Las Tunas racerlet, Arrhyton ainictum
 Havana racerlet, Arrhyton dolichura
 Zapata long-tailed racerlet, Arrhyton procerum
 Oriente brown-capped racerlet, Arrhyton redimitum
 Oriente black racerlet, Arrhyton supernum
 Broad-striped racerlet, Arrhyton taeniatum
 Guaniguanico racerlet, Arrhyton tanyplectum
 Cuban short-tailed racerlet, Arrhyton vittatum
 Cuban lesser racer, Caraiba andreae
 Cuban racer, Cubophis cantherigerus
 Cuban water snake, Tretanorhinus variabilis
 Salt marsh snake, Nerodia clarkii
 Canasi trope, Tropidophis celiae
 Broad-banded trope, Tropidophis feicki
 Cuban dusky trope, Tropidophis fuscus
 Escambray white-necked trope, Tropidophis galacelidus
 Escambray small-headed trope, Tropidophis hardyi
 Cuban khaki trope, Tropidophis hendersoni
 Spotted red trope, Tropidophis maculatus
 Giant trope, Tropidophis melanurus
 Zebra trope, Tropidophis morenoi
 Dark-bellied trope, Tropidophis nigriventris
 Spotted brown trope, Tropidophis pardalis
 Oriente white-necked trope, Tropidophis pilsbryi
 Yellow-banded trope, Tropidophis semicinctus
 Sancti Spiritus trope, Tropidophis spiritus
 Gracile banded trope, Tropidophis wrighti
 Guanahacabibes trope, Tropidophis xanthogaster
 Maisi blindsnake, Typhlops anchaurus
 Cuban pallid blindsnake, Typhlops anousius
 Havana giant blindsnake, Typhlops arator
 Cuban short-nosed blindsnake, Typhlops contorhinus
 Pinar del Rio giant blindsnake, Typhlops golyathi
 Cuban brown blindsnake, Typhlops lumbricalis
 Imias blindsnake, Typhlops notorachius
 Guantanamo Bay blinddsnake, Typhlops perimychus 
 Cienfuegos blindsnake, Typhlops satelles

Lizards

 Cuban pale-necked galliwasp, Diploglossus delasagra
 Cuban small-eared galliwasp, Diploglossus garridoi
 Cuban spotted galliwasp, Diploglossus nigropunctatus
 Ahl's anole, Anolis ahli
 Allison's anole, Anolis allisoni
 Anfiodlul anole, Anolis anfiloquioi
 Baracoa anole, Anolis baracoae
 Bay anole, Anolis argillaceus
 Black-cheeked bush anole, Anolis macilentus
 Blue-eyed grass-bush anole, Anolis alutaceus
 Branch anole, Anolis birama
 Bueycito anole, Anolis allogus
 Cabo Cruz banded anole, Anolis guafe
 Cabo Cruz bearded anole, Anolis agueroi
 Cabo Cruz pallid anole, Anolis ruibali
 Cabo Cruz trunk anole, Anolis confusus
 Cave anole, Anolis lucius
 Cayko Frances anole, Anolis pigmaequestris
 Central anole, Anolis centralis
 Cuban brown anole, Anolis sagrei
 Cuban green anole, Anolis porcatus
 Cuban spiny-plant anole, Anolis pumilus
 Cuban twig anole, Anolis angusticeps
 Cubitas anole, Anolis jubar
 Cupeyal anole, Anolis cupeyalensis
 Escambray bearded anole, Anolis guamuhaya
 Finca Ceres anole, Anolis juangundlachi
 Five-striped grass anole, Anolis ophiolepis
 Guamuhaya anole, Anolis delafuentei
 Garrido's anole, Anolis garridoi
 Gray-banded green anole, Anolis toldo
 Guantanamo anole, Anolis argenteolus
 Guantanamo twig anole, Anolis alayoni
 Habana anole, Anolis homolechis 
 Herradura anole, Anolis bremeri
 Holguin anole, Anolis noblei
 Imias anole, Anolis imias
 Jatibonico anole, Anolis isolepis
 Knight anole, Anolis equestris
 Matanzas anole, Anolis spectrum
 Moa anole, Anolis fugitivus
 Mountain anole, Anolis clivicola
 Nueva Gerona anole, Anolis paternus
 Oriente bearded anole, Anolis porcus
 Oriente pallid anole, Anolis litoralis
 Peach anole, Anolis loysiana
 Peninsula anole, Anolis quadriocellifer
 Pimienta green anole, Anolis oporinus
 Pinardei Rio anole, Anolis mestrei
 Pineland bush anole, Anolis inexpectatus
 Purial bush anole, Anolis vescus
 Sagua de Tánamo anole, Anolis rubribarbus
 Santiago grass anole, Anolis rejectus
 Short-bearded anole, Anolis chamaeleonides
 Sierra anole, Anolis guazuma
 Small-fanned bush anole, Anolis alfaroi
 Smallwood's anole, Anolis smallwoodi
 Turquino emerald anole, Anolis incredulus
 Turquino green-mottled anole, Anolis altitudinalis
 Turquino white-fanned anole, Anolis turquinensis
 Vanidicus anole, Anolis vanidicus
 Vinales anole, Anolis vermiculatus
 West Cuban anole, Anolis bartschi
 Western bearded anole, Anolis barbatus
 Western giant anole, Anolis luteogularis
 Yateras anole, Anolis cyanopleurus
 Yellow-fanned pallid anole, Anolis terueli 
 Cuban iguana, Cyclura nubila
 Cuban night lizard, Cricosaura typica
 Underwood's Spectacled Tegu, Gymnophthalmus underwoodi (I)
 Tropical house gecko, Hemidactylus mabouia (I)
 Mediterranean house gecko, Hemidactylus turcicus (I)
 American wall gecko, Tarentola americana
 Tuberculate gecko, Tarentola crombiei
 Reyes' Caribbean gecko, Aristelliger reyesi
 Ashy gecko, Sphaerodactylus elegans
 Baracoan eyespot sphaero, Sphaerodactylus celicara
 Black-spotted least gecko, Sphaerodactylus nigropunctatus
 Barbour's least gecko, Sphaerodactylus torrei
 Cabo Cruz banded sphaero, Sphaerodactylus docimus
 Camaguey least gecko, Sphaerodactylus scaber 
 El Yunque least gecko, Sphaerodactylus bromeliarum
 Guantanamo collared sphaero, Sphaerodactylus schwartzi
 Guantanamo least gecko, Sphaerodactylus armasi
 Isle of Pines sphaero, Sphaerodactylus storeyae
 Juventud least gecko, Sphaerodactylus oliveri
 Mantanzas least gecko, Sphaerodactylus intermedius 
 Ocellated gecko, Sphaerodactylus argus
 Pepper sphaero, Sphaerodactylus pimienta
 Ramsden's least gecko, Sphaerodactylus ramsdeni
 Reef gecko, Sphaerodactylus notatus
 Richard's banded sphaero, Sphaerodactylus richardi
 Ruibal's least gecko, Sphaerodactylus ruibali 
 Santiago de Cuba sphaero, Sphaerodactylus dimorphicus
 Siboney gray-headed sphaero, Sphaerodactylus siboney 
 Sierra Maestra three-banded sphaero, Sphaerodactylus ocujal
 Turquino collared sphaero, Sphaerodactylus cricoderus
 Yellow-headed gecko, Gonatodes albogularis
 Cabo Corrientes curlytail lizard, Leiocephalus stictigaster
 Cuban curlytail lizard, Leiocephalus cubensis
 Monte Verde curlytail lizard, Leiocephalus macropus
 Mountain curlytail lizard, Leiocephalus raviceps
 Northern curly-tailed lizard, Leiocephalus carinatus
 Sierra curlytail lizard, Leiocephalus onaneyi
 Auber's ameiva, Pholidoscelis auberi

Amphisbaenia
 Cuban many-ringed amphisbaena, Amphisbaena barbouri
 Cuban worm lizard, Amphisbaena cubana
 Cuban pink amphisbaena, Amphisbaena carlgansi
 Spotted amphisbaena, Cadea blanoides
 Sharp-nosed amphisbaena, Cadea palirostrata

Amphibia

Frogs
 American bullfrog, Rana catesbeiana (I)
 Baracoa dwarf frog, Eleutherodactylus orientalis
 Barred rock frog, Eleutherodactylus klinikowskii
 Boca de Yumuri frog, Eleutherodactylus bartonsmithi
 Breasts-of-Julie frog, Eleutherodactylus tetajulia
 Cabo Cruz frog, Eleutherodactylus tonyi
 Camarones red-legged frog, Eleutherodactylus erythroproctus
 Canasi frog, Eleutherodactylus blairhedgesi
 Cuban bromeliad frog, Eleutherodactylus varians
 Cuban butterfly frog, Eleutherodactylus mariposa
 Cuban cave frog, Eleutherodactylus thomasi
 Cuban Colin frog, Eleutherodactylus eileenae
 Cuban giant frog, Eleutherodactylus zeus
 Cuban gray frog, Eleutherodactylus greyi
 Cuban groin-spot frog, Eleutherodactylus atkinsi
 Cuban khaki frog, Eleutherodactylus ronaldi
 Cuban long-legged frog, Eleutherodactylus dimidiatus
 Cuban pineland frog, Eleutherodactylus pinarensis
 Cuban red-rumped frog, Eleutherodactylus acmonis
 Cuban stream frog, Eleutherodactylus riparius
 Cuban telegraph frog, Eleutherodactylus auriculatus
 Cuban tree frog, Osteopilus septentrionalis
 Dark-faced bromeliad frog, Eleutherodactylus melacara
 Dwarf grass frog, Eleutherodactylus adelus
 Eastern Cuba grass frog, Eleutherodactylus feichtingeri
 Greenhouse frog, Eleutherodactylus planirostris
 Guanahacabibes frog, Eleutherodactylus guanahacabibes
 Guaniguanico yellow-mottled frog, Eleutherodactylus goini
 Guantanamera frog, Eleutherodactylus guantanamera
 Isla de la Juventud bromeliad frog, Eleutherodactylus staurometopon
 Miranda robber frog, Eleutherodactylus pezopetrus
 Maisi frog, Eleutherodactylus bresslerae
 Monte Iberia dwarf frog, Eleutherodactylus iberia
 Nipe frog, Eleutherodactylus pezopetrus
 Orange long-nosed frog, Eleutherodactylus jaumei
 Oriente coastal frog, Eleutherodactylus etheridgei
 Oriente greenish-yellow frog, Eleutherodactylus principalis
 Oriente mottled frog, Eleutherodactylus simulans
 Oriente pallid frog, Eleutherodactylus toa
 Oriente stream frog, Eleutherodactylus cuneatus
 Oriente tree frog, Eleutherodactylus ionthus
 Oriente yellow-bellied frog, Eleutherodactylus leberi
 Oriente yellow-mottled frog, Eleutherodactylus ricordii
 Pico Turquino robber frog, Eleutherodactylus intermedius
 Pinar del Rio bromeliad frog, Eleutherodactylus olibrus
 Rosario red-legged frog, Eleutherodactylus zugi
 Short-legged stream frog, Eleutherodactylus rivularis
 Sierra Maestra blotched frog, Eleutherodactylus michaelschmidi
 Sierra Maestra long-legged frog, Eleutherodactylus maestrensis
 Trinidad flathead frog, Eleutherodactylus casparii
 Trinidad groin-spot frog, Eleutherodactylus emiliae
 Turquino fern frog, Eleutherodactylus glamyrus
 Turquino red-armed frog, Eleutherodactylus cubanus
 Turquino spiny frog, Eleutherodactylus gundlachi
 Turquino stream frog, Eleutherodactylus turquinensis
 Turquino white-footed frog, Eleutherodactylus albipes
 Western Cuba grass frog, Eleutherodactylus varleyi
 Western spiny frog, Eleutherodactylus symingtoni
 Yellow-striped pygmy eleuth, Eleutherodactylus limbatus

Toads
 Western giant toad, Peltophryne fustiger
 Eastern giant toad, Peltophryne peltocephala
 Cuban high-crested toad, Peltophryne gundlachi
 Cuban small-eared toad, Peltophryne empusa
 Zapata toad, Peltophryne florentinoi
 Cuban long-nosed toad, Peltophryne longinasus
 Cuban pine toad, Peltophryne cataulaciceps
 Cuban spotted toad, Peltophryne taladai

References

Sources
http://www.dtcuba.com/showreport.aspx?lng=2&c=112
http://www.earthsendangered.com/continent5AM-all.html
http://fauna-de-cuba.mcn-caibarien.org/species/&tree_h=2.Reptilia
http://fauna-de-cuba.mcn-caibarien.org/species/&tree_h=2.Amphibia

 List
Amphibians and reptiles
Cuba
Cuba
 List
Cuba
Cuba